Jewish musicians by country:

Argentina
Austria
Composers
Britain
Canada
France
Germany
Hungary
Israel
Composers
Mexico
Poland
Russia
South Africa
United States
Composers
:Category:Jewish American musicians

See also
Jewish music
:Category:Jewish musicians by nationality

Musicians by country

Lists of musicians